Ingrid Chatarina Larsson is a Swedish actress born on 2 April 1947 in Stockholm.

Career 
Larsson's first appearance was with her father, in Lisebergsteatern in 1964, in the variety show Far i luften. She studied at drama school in Malmö from 1967-1970, and later worked at Stockholms stadsteater from 1970-1976, and later at a Scanian theatre. 

She has worked as a teacher at a theatre school in Stockholm. In 1979, she was awarded the Theater Society's Daniel Engdahl scholarship. She is daughter of actor and artist Egon Larsson and singer Gun Larsson.

Selected filmography
En kille och en tjej (1975)
Den allvarsamma leken (1997)
Hitler och vi på Klamparegatan (1997)
Waiting for the Tenor (1998)
S:t Mikael (TV series, 1998)
Vägen ut (1999)
Innan frosten (2005)
Carambole (2005)
Kommissionen (TV series, 2005)
Cockpit (2012)
A Man Called Ove (2015)

References

External links

Swedish actresses
1947 births
Actresses from Stockholm
Living people